Cesar Millan's Leader of the Pack is an American documentary television series on the Nat Geo Wild. The series premiered on January 5, 2013.

Premise
The series follows Cesar Millan as he helps give shelter dogs new homes and takes place at Millan's newest Dog Psychology Center located in Miraflores, Spain. Candidate individuals and families compete against each other to demonstrate that they can offer each dog a matching and balanced home. One of the candidates wins the contest each episode and is given the dog.

Episodes

Season 1 (2012)

References

2010s American documentary television series
2013 American television series debuts
English-language television shows
2013 American television series endings